Olearia eremaea is a species of flowering plant in the family Asteraceae and is endemic to inland areas of Western Australia. It is a shrub with scattered, more or less elliptic leaves, and white and yellow, daisy-like inflorescences.

Description
Its stems and leaves are covered with minute glandular hairs. Both surfaces of the leaves are sticky and densely covered with glandular hairs. Flowering occurs in July and August and the fruit is a pale brown achene, the pappus with 16 to 25 long bristles and a smaller number of much shorter ones.

Taxonomy
Olearia eremaea was first formally described in 1990 by Nicholas Sèan Lander in the journal Nuytsia from specimens collected by Alex George near Cosmo Newbery in 1961. The specific epithet refers to the distribution of this species in the Eremaean Botanical Province of Western Australia.

Distribution and habitat
Olearia eremaea grows in shrubland on stony soil in scattered places in the Gascoyne and Great Victoria Desert biogeographic regions of inland Western Australia.

Conservation status
This daisy bush is listed as "not threatened" by the Department of Biodiversity, Conservation and Attractions.

References

eremaea
Flora of Western Australia
Plants described in 1990